Poor Ferdinand (Swedish: Stackars Ferdinand) is a 1941 Swedish comedy film directed by Nils Jerring and starring Thor Modéen,  Åke Söderblom and Tollie Zellman. It was shot at the Råsunda Studios in Stockholm. The film's sets were designed by the art director Arne Åkermark.

Cast
 Thor Modéen as Ferdinand Dellander
 Åke Söderblom as 	Åke Palm
 Eric Abrahamsson as 	Herman Sjöberg
 Allan Bohlin as 	Gösta Dellander
 Tollie Zellman as 	Selma Dellander
 Gaby Stenberg as 	Florence Day
 Siv Ericks as Karin Dellander
 Karin Nordgren as 	Gunilla Dacke
 Hugo Björne as Dacke
 Georg Funkquist as 	Rutger Benckert
 Viran Rydkvist as 	Hulda
 Carl Hagman as 	Teofil Johansson
 Julia Cæsar as 	Mrs. Hagman
 Emy Hagman as 	Happy Woman
 Paul Hagman as Restaurant guest
 Torsten Winge as 	Wigmaker
 Torsten Hillberg as 	Director
 John Melin as Mr. Glad 
 Gerd Mårtensson as Pretty girl 
 Yngve Nyqvist as Guest 
 John Elfström as 	Actor

References

Bibliography 
 Holmstrom, John. The Moving Picture Boy: An International Encyclopaedia from 1895 to 1995, Norwich, Michael Russell, 1996, p. 169.

External links 
 

1941 films
Swedish comedy films
1941 comedy films
1940s Swedish-language films
Films directed by Nils Jerring
1940s Swedish films